Gourrier is a surname. Notable people with the surname include:

Dana Gourrier (born 1979), American actress
John Fred Gourrier (1941–2005), American musician
Junior Gourrier (born 1992), Central African footballer
Pierre Gourrier (born 1947), French weightlifter

See also
Gourriel